Desyatkino is a rural locality (a selo) in Suslovsky Selsoviet, Birsky District, Bashkortostan, Russia. The population was 42 as of 2010. There are 5 streets.

Geography 
Desyatkino is located 15 km east of Birsk (the district's administrative centre) by road. Suslovo is the nearest rural locality.

References 

Rural localities in Birsky District